James Hodges Atkins IV (born June 23, 1978) is a former professional American football player who played defensive tackle for two seasons for the Tennessee Titans and the San Francisco 49ers. He attended Virginia Union University in 2002, which is a Division II college.

1978 births
Living people
Sportspeople from Brooklyn
Players of American football from New York City
American football defensive tackles
Nassau Lions football players
Virginia Union Panthers football players
Tennessee Titans players
San Francisco 49ers players